Waitohiariki Quayle (born 1950, Gladstone, New-Zealand) is a Māori Anglican bishop. She was ordained as Bishop of Upoko o Te Ika in the Te Pīhopatanga o Aotearoa at Rathkeale College on Thursday, September 12, 2019, where she also received a Haka greeting from her community. This makes her the first female Māori bishop in the Anglican Church, and the first woman born in New Zealand to become a bishop in the Anglican Communion. Her primary cares are housing, health needs, and youth suicide risk and empowerment.

Personal life 
She was born in Gladstone in a farming community. Her laborer father was Anglican and her mother a Mormon. She had 12 brothers and sisters, with names reflecting different parts of the land where they grew up. She has links with both Ngāti Kahungunu and Whakatohea tribes. She did not have much connection with a physical church in her young life, in that an Anglican priest rather would visit her family home with all the laborers that would stay with them. Mormon elders would also stop by. It was not until her teenage years, when her mom passed at age 16, that her godfather, once a month, would take her to a church, Te Hepara Pai, in Masterton. It was there that she met her husband, Colin Quayle, a Pākehā, who was confirmed in the faith there shortly before his passing.

She was married at age 19 and has three adult children and five grandchildren.

She was widowed in 1990, when Colin got a brain tumor at age 38.

She received her bachelor's degree in bicultural social work from Te Wānanga o Aotearoa when she was in her mid-50s.

Prior to being ordained bishop in 2019, she held the role of Māori community health services manager at Whaiora Māori Health based in Masterton, where she oversaw staff managing multiple government health contracts.

Ordained Ministry 
When Te Hepara Pai was struggling and deciding if it should stay open or close, she stepped into her first role there as a minister.

Theologically, she respects both the Māori culture belief in a number of gods, and Christianity's belief in one, and admittedly continues to work through that disconnection herself.

Having been ordained a deacon in 2013, and ordained as a priest in 2014 by Muru Walters, she was Archdeacon of Wairarapa from 2015 to 2019.

Archbishop Don Tamihere was joined as celebrant for the ordination by Archbishop Fereimi Cama, Archbishop Philip Richardson and the Assistant Bishop of Adelaide Denise Ferguson for the ordination of Quayle in 2019.

On Saturday, April 4, 2020, along with Archbishop Don Tamihere, Quayle presided over Aotearoa New Zealand's first virtual commissioning service, which occurred at Taranaki Cathedral of St Mary. It also marked the occasion of Jacqui Paterson being the first woman to become Dean of Taranaki; and Jay Ruka, – of Te Āti Awa, Ngāti Mutunga, Ngāti Koata and Ngā Puhi – becoming the first Māori leader to take up the role.

She has been on the board of Papawai and Kaikōkirikiri Trusts since 2001, and serving as chair since 2011, representing the Anglican Church, which deals with lands vested to the trust by the Papawai and Kaikōkirikiri Trusts Act 1943. The group's core business is land based asset management that also annually contributes to education and scholarships.

References

Living people
1950 births
New Zealand Māori women
New Zealand Māori religious leaders
21st-century Anglican bishops in New Zealand
Women Anglican bishops
Anglican bishops of Te Upoko o Te Ika